Karambir Singh Ghuman is an Indian politician and the MLA representing the Dasuya Assembly constituency in the Punjab Legislative Assembly. He is a member of the Aam Aadmi Party.

MLA
He was elected in 2022.  The Aam Aadmi Party gained a strong 79% majority in the sixteenth Punjab Legislative Assembly by winning 92 out of 117 seats in the 2022 Punjab Legislative Assembly election. MP Bhagwant Mann was sworn in as Chief Minister on 16 March 2022.
Committee assignments of Punjab Legislative Assembly  
Member (2022–23) Committee on Subordinate Legislation
Member (2022–23) House Committee

Electoral performance

References

External links
 Affidavit in ECI
 Myneta Info

Living people
Punjab, India MLAs 2022–2027
Aam Aadmi Party politicians from Punjab, India
Year of birth missing (living people)